Bud Helbig, born Erwin E. Helbig, (March 7, 1919 – February 7, 2002) was an American painter, illustrator and sculptor. His artwork depicted the American West, especially cowboys.

Early life
Helbig was born on March 7, 1919, in Butte, Montana. He grew up in Minnesota, Wisconsin, and Montana's Bitterroot Valley.

Helbig was educated at the Mills Academy in Saint Paul, Minnesota. He graduated from the School of the Art Institute of Chicago.

Career
Helbig began his career as a magazine illustrator in Chicago. He remained in Chicago for two decades until 1969, when he moved to Kalispell, Montana, to become an independent artist. In his paintings, Helbig depicted the American West, especially cowboys. He also designed bronze sculptures.

Helbig joined the Cowboy Artists of America in 1972. His work was added to the permanent collection of the Hockaday Museum of Art in Kalispell.

Personal life and death
Helbig had two sons, Ric and Vern. He resided in Kalispell, Montana.

Helbig died on February 7, 2002, in Kalispell, at age 82.

References

1919 births
2002 deaths
People from Butte, Montana
People from Kalispell, Montana
School of the Art Institute of Chicago alumni
Artists from Montana
American male painters
20th-century American painters
21st-century American painters
American magazine illustrators
American male sculptors
20th-century American sculptors
20th-century American male artists
21st-century American sculptors
21st-century American male artists
Artists of the American West
Painters from Montana
Sculptors from Montana